Sir Hugh Reginald Brentnall Pelham,  (born 26 August 1954) is a cell biologist who has contributed to our understanding of the body's response to rises in temperature through the synthesis of heat shock proteins. He served as director of the Medical Research Council (MRC) Laboratory of Molecular Biology (LMB) between 2006 and 2018.

Education
Pelham was educated at Marlborough College in Marlborough, Wiltshire and Christ's College, Cambridge. He graduated with a Master of Arts degree in Natural Sciences followed by a PhD for research on transcription and translation in immature blood cells (Reticulocytes). His PhD was supervised by Richard J. Jackson and Tim Hunt, who went on to receive the Nobel Prize in Physiology or Medicine in 2001.

Career and research
Pelham is an authority on the movement of proteins within cells. Pelhams's work has explained how some proteins can protect cells from damage. He has also shown how cells remove damaged or unwanted proteins – vital for maintaining their healthy functioning. More recently, his research investigates how proteins are modified and sorted to their correct places within cells and aims to find ways of blocking these processes.

Pelham has been a visiting professor at the University of Zurich and held many posts at the Laboratory of Molecular Biology in Cambridge, where he succeeded Richard Henderson to become the LMB's Director in 2006. He has been an Honorary Professor of Molecular Biology at the University of Cambridge since 2015.

Awards and honours
Pelham was knighted by Elizabeth II in the 2011 Birthday Honours and elected a Fellow of the Royal Society (FRS) in 1988. His certificate of election reads: 

Pelham gave the Florey Lecture in 1992, was elected a Fellow of the Academy of Medical Sciences (FMedSci) in 1998. In 1999 he gave the Croonian Lecture and he was awarded the King Faisal International Prize in 1996. He won the Louis-Jeantet Prize for Medicine in 1991 and the EMBO Gold Medal in 1989. He was awarded the Colworth Medal from the Biochemical Society in 1988 and elected a member of the European Molecular Biology Organization (EMBO) in 1985.

References

Living people
Fellows of the Royal Society
Knights Bachelor
Members of the European Molecular Biology Organization
People educated at Marlborough College
1954 births